Shishikura (written: 宍倉) is a Japanese surname. Notable people with the surname include:

 (born 1946), Japanese volleyball player
 (born 1960), Japanese mathematician

Japanese-language surnames